Andrew Lewis Drummond (died 1921) was chief of the United States Secret Service from 1891 to 1894. 

Drummond joined the United States Secret Service in 1871. In 1894, he resigned from the Secret Service and went on to head a detective agency in New York.

In 1909, Drummond published the book True Detective Stories. The book contained narratives of criminal cases he had worked on during his career, many of which involved counterfeiting.

References 

1921 deaths
Directors of the United States Secret Service